Feng Ru (1883–1912), also known as Fung Joe Guey, was a pioneering Chinese aviator and aircraft designer.

Life and career
Born in Enping, Guangdong, Feng moved to the United States at the age of twelve, living and working in various parts of California before trying to settle in San Francisco in 1906, the year that the San Francisco earthquake struck. The earthquake spoiled his plan and sent him fleeing to Oakland. Fung was fascinated by the Wright Brothers' plane and because he was always interested in machinery, one of the first things he did after arriving in Oakland was to organize an airplane manufacturing company, only a few years after the Wright Brothers' Kitty Hawk flight (1903).

On September 22, 1909 (several newspapers report the date as Tuesday, September 21, 1909) Fung was the first Chinese man known to fly in America (and first aviator of any nationality to fly in California and the West Coast of the United States). He had constructed his own biplane, improving on the Wrights' blueprints. Fung flew in a wide circle, despite the harsh winds; after twenty minutes, however, the bolt holding the propeller to the shaft snapped off, and he was brought to a stop, suffering only minor bruising. The flight was reported in several papers, including The San Francisco Call and the Oakland Tribune.

Feng returned to China on March 21, 1911, upon the request of Chinese revolutionary Sun Yat-sen, who wanted to use Feng's planes to aid the rebellion against the Qing dynasty. He was accompanied by six Oakland residents and another biplane of his own design. Sun Yat-sen insisted that he be buried at the Mausoleum of the 72 Huanghuagang Martyrs, and that his tomb be inscribed with the words "Pioneer of Chinese Aviation".

Legacy
On 21 September 2009, a bronze bust of Fung, the "Father of Chinese Aviation", was unveiled in a ceremony at Laney College in Oakland.
One of Fung's workshops, where he designed and built parts of his biplane, was on a site that is now part of the Laney campus, near the heart of commercial Chinatown. The event was organized by Steve Lavoie of the Oakland Public Library and Lieutenant-Colonel Roger Glenn of Amelia Earhart Senior Squadron 188, Civil Air Patrol.

The book Dragonwings is partially inspired by Fung Joe Guey.

See also
Zee Yee Lee
Senyet Young
Zhu Binhou
Kwon Ki-ok
Aircraft of China both civil and military use from 1937 and before

References

Further reading

1880s births
1912 deaths
20th-century Chinese people
Aviation pioneers
Aviators killed in aviation accidents or incidents in China
Chinese aircraft designers
Chinese aviators
Chinese expatriates in the United States
People from Enping
Victims of aviation accidents or incidents in 1912